Royal Air Force High Ercall or more simply RAF High Ercall is a former Royal Air Force sector station situated near the village of High Ercall,  northeast of Shrewsbury, Shropshire, England.

History
Construction of the airfield began in 1938 and was mostly complete by 1940. The airbase was initially run by RAF Maintenance Command and civilians from the Ministry of Aircraft Production also worked at the airfield. From 1941 onward the airbase was taken over by RAF Fighter Command, and was used mainly by night fighter units, such as No. 68 Squadron and No. 255 Squadron. From 1942 the airfield was also used by the United States Army 8th Air Force's 309 Fighter Squadron, which flew British Supermarine Spitfires with USAAF markings. In 1943 the role of the airbase changed to become focused on training; it was used mainly by No. 60 Operational Training Unit for this purpose.

From 1951 the station became a Relief Landing Ground for flying and navigation training. If pilots were unable to land at their main base they could divert to High Ercall. The Station fulfilled this role from March 1951 for No. 6 Flying Training School RAF, and from 1957 for the Central Navigation and Control School which was based at RAF Shawbury.

Squadrons
 No. 41 Squadron RAF
 No. 68 Squadron RAF
 No. 247 Squadron RAF
 No. 255 Squadron RAF
 No. 257 Squadron RAF
 No. 285 Squadron RAF
 No. 535 Squadron RAF

Other units
 No. 3 Aircraft Delivery Flight RAF.
 No. 60 Operational Training Unit RAF was reformed here in May 1943 to train intruder crews using the de Havilland Mosquito.
 No. 1456 (Fighter) Flight RAF
 No. 29 Maintenance Unit RAF (MU)
 No. 99 Maintenance Unit RAF
 No. 222 Maintenance Unit RAF
 No. 236 Maintenance Unit RAF
 No. 6 Flying Training School RAF
 27th Fighter Squadron (USAAF)
 92d Fighter Squadron (USAAF)
 309th Fighter Squadron
 810 Naval Air Squadron
 No. 1489 (Fighter) Gunnery Flight RAF

Post-military use
In 1946, a Handley Page Halifax bomber at High Ercall was purchased by Australian pilot Geoff Wikner who used the plane to fly home. Wikner also charged a number of passengers to embark on the flight with him. This marked the first post-war commercial flight between the United Kingdom and Australia.

The airbase closed in the early 1960s.

Between the 1960s and 1990s, the site was the Multi-Occupational Training and Education Centre (MOTEC) which provided training for workers including HGV drivers and mechanics and hosted the RTITB National Junior Mechanic Competition 1987.

The majority of the runways have been removed leaving only small tracks however nine hangars still are present spread out over the site and near a local village. A local Wartime Aircraft Recovery Group also occupies a section of the site.

In 2002 it was proposed to build a centre for asylum seekers on the site.

In 2014 the site was sold to the Greenhous Group who later successfully applied to the council to store new cars there before they were sold on the UK market.

See also
 List of former Royal Air Force stations

References

Citations

Bibliography

High Ercall
Telford and Wrekin
High Ercall
Military installations closed in 1962